Max Glasser (born August 16, 2000) is an American soccer player who currently plays as a defender for Monterey Bay FC in the USL Championship.

Career

Youth and college 
Glasser spent his youth career with Marin FC, training with the club starting in his U13 season through his departure to UC Davis. Glasser played four years of college soccer at UC Davis between 2018 and 2022, making 71 appearances, scoring 3 goals and tallying 10 assists.

Professional 
On February 14, 2023, it was announced Glasser had signed his first professional contract with USL Championship side Monterey Bay FC ahead of their 2023 season. He made his professional debut on March 11, 2023, starting in the club's 2023 season opener. He achieved his first assist in the 5–3 win against Hartford Athletic.

References

External links 

 

2000 births
Living people
American soccer players
Association football defenders
Monterey Bay FC players
Soccer players from California
UC Davis Aggies men's soccer players
USL Championship players